The  (NIPS) is an inter-university research institute and part of the National Institute of Natural Sciences, located in the city of Okazaki, Aichi, Japan. It was established in 2004

External links
NIPS Official Website

 

International research institutes
Universities and colleges in Japan
Science and technology in Japan
Research institutes in Japan
Japanese national universities
Okazaki, Aichi
2004 establishments in Japan